Pacific campaign or Pacific campaigns, usually refers to the Pacific War (1941–1945): campaigns involving Allied and Axis forces, in the Pacific and Asia during World War II. 

Within the context of World War II, "Pacific campaigns" include:

 Pacific Ocean theater of World War II: the naval and island campaigns in the Central Pacific, North Pacific and South Central Pacific, and;
 South West Pacific theater of World War II: the campaigns in and around the Philippines, New Guinea, Australia, most of the Dutch East Indies (Indonesia) and the British colonies in Borneo.

Pacific theater of operations is a generic term, in US military history, for all campaigns in the Pacific during World War II.

Pacific campaign may also refer to the following campaigns in other wars:

 Pacific Coast campaign (Mexican–American War) (1846–1848) United States Navy operations during the Mexican–American War
 Pacific campaign (Spanish–American War), between the United States and Spain during the Spanish–American War of 1898
 Asian and Pacific theatre of World War I (1914–1918), between the Allies and the German Empire